James Morris Roy King (born 15 September 1942) is a former English cricketer.  King was a right-handed batsman who bowled both leg break and right-arm medium pace.  He was born in Bristol.

King made his first-class debut for Gloucestershire against Cambridge University in 1966.  He made 2 further first-class appearances, both in 1966, against Glamorgan and Worcestershire in the County Championship.  In his 3 first-class matches, he scored 47 runs at an average of 9.40, with a high score of 28.

References

External links
James King at ESPNcricinfo
James King at CricketArchive

1942 births
Living people
Cricketers from Bristol
English cricketers
Gloucestershire cricketers